is a passenger railway station in the town of Daigo, Kuji District, Ibaraki Prefecture, operated by East Japan Railway Company (JR East).

Lines
Kami-Ogawa Station is served by the Suigun Line, and is located 47.3 rail kilometers from the official starting point of the line at Mito Station.

Station layout
The station consists of two opposed side platforms connected to the station building by a footbridge. The station is staffed.

Platforms

History
Kami-Ogawa Station opened on August 15, 1925. The station was absorbed into the JR East network upon the privatization of the Japanese National Railways (JNR) on April 1, 1987.

Passenger statistics
In fiscal 2019, the station was used by an average of 32 passengers daily (boarding passengers only).

Surrounding area

Kami-Ogawa Post Office
Kujigawa River

See also
List of railway stations in Japan

References

External links

  JR East Station information 

Railway stations in Ibaraki Prefecture
Suigun Line
Railway stations in Japan opened in 1925
Daigo, Ibaraki